The Rapid River is a  river on the Upper Peninsula of the U.S. state of Michigan. It rises in southeast Marquette County and flows into Little Bay de Noc on Lake Michigan near the community of Rapid River.

See also
List of rivers of Michigan

References 

Rivers of Michigan
Rivers of Delta County, Michigan
Rivers of Marquette County, Michigan
Tributaries of Lake Michigan